Circle the Wagons is the fourteenth studio album by the Norwegian band Darkthrone. The album was released 5 April 2010 by Peaceville Records. Fenriz, the band's drummer, described the music as Darkthrone's "own brand of heavy metal/speed metal-punk", and declared it a further shift from their old black metal style. About half of the album was written by Fenriz and half by Nocturno Culto.

The catalog number "ANTI-KING OV HELL 001" appeared in the liner notes.

Track listing

Credits
Nocturno Culto – vocals, electric guitar, bass guitar
Fenriz – drums, electric guitar, vocals
Dennis Dread - cover art

Charts

References

2010 albums
Darkthrone albums
Peaceville Records albums